This is an alphabetical listing of Ukrainian painters.

A 
 Alexander Aksinin
 Aljoscha
 Nathan Altman
 Emma Andijewska 
 Mykhailo Andriienko-Nechytailo

B 
Nikolai Bartossik
Marie Bashkirtseff
Tatiana Belokonenko
Roman Bezpalkiv
Kateryna Vasylivna Bilokur
Seraphima Blonskaya
Vladimir Bobri
Alexander Bogomazov
Vladimir Borovikovsky
Mykhailo Boychuk
Isaak Brodsky
Mykola Burachek
David Burliuk
Wladimir Burliuk
Borys Buryak

C 
Illya Chichkan 
Evgeniy Chuikov
Mykhaylo Chornyi

D 
Mykhailo Derehus (1904–1997)
Mychajlo Dmytrenko
Grigoriy Dovzhenko

F 
Igor Filippov
Borys Fedorenko

G 
Eugene Garin
Nikolai Getman
Yefim Golyshev
John D. Graham 
Alexis Gritchenko
Alexandr Guristyuk
Olga Gurski

H 
Volodymyr Harbuz
Mykola Hlushchenko
Jacques Hnizdovsky
Oleksandr Hnylytskyi
Olesya Hudyma
Vasile Hutopilă
Liuboslav Hutsaliuk

K 
Mykhaylo Khmelko 
Alexander Khvostenko-Khvostov 
Michael Kmit
Jaroslava Korol
Kyriak Kostandi
Alexander Kostetsky
Fedir Krychevsky 
Vasyl Krychevsky
Viktor Kryzhanovsky
Arkhip Kuindzhi
Andrei Kushnir
Nikolai Dmitriyevich Kuznetsov

L 
Arnold Lakhovsky
 Kost Lavro 
Mykola Lebid
Felix Lembersky
Dmitry Levitzky
Alexander Litovchenko
Anton Losenko
Louis Lozowick
Sergey Lunov
Oksana Lytvyn

M 
Yuri Makoveychuk
Kazimir Malevich
Fedir Manailo
Mane-Katz
Ivan Marchuk
Anastasiya Markovich
Michael Matusevitch
Vadym Meller
Leonid Mezheritski
Oleg Minko
Abraham Mintchine
Evsey Moiseenko
Apollon Mokritsky
Oleksandr Murashko
Mykhaylo Berkos

N 
Heorhiy Narbut 
Anatoliy Nasedkin
Ulyana Nesheva
Pyotr Nilus

O
Katerina Omelchuk
Sarkis Ordyan
Volodymyr Orlovsky
Alexander Osmerkin

P 
Victor Palmov
Anatol Petrytsky
Mykola Pymonenko
Les Podervyansky
Ihor Podolchak
Ivan Pokhitonov
Leonid Pozen
Maria Prymachenko
Sasha Putrya

R 
Maria Raevskaia-Ivanova
Vlada Ralko
Fyodor Pavlovich Reshetnikov
Misha Reznikoff
Olga Rozanova
Ivan Rutkovych
Vasiliy Ryabchenko

S 
Mykola Samokysh
Taras Shevchenko
Mykola Shmatko
Oleksii Shovkunenko
Nikolai Skadovsky
Marina Skugareva
Opanas Slastion
Anton Solomoukha
Ivan Soshenko
Vladimir Sosnovsky
Rufin Sudkovsky
Supremus
Serhiy Svetoslavsky
Sergei Sviatchenko
Stanislav Sychov
Victor Sydorenko

T 
Vladimir Tatlin
Oleg Tistol
Ivan Trush
Kostyantyn Trutovsky
Mykola Ivanovych Tseluiko
Mikhail Turovsky
Roman Turovsky-Savchuk

V 
Matvei Vaisberg
Serhii Vasylkivsky
Anton Vasyutinsky
Boris Vladimirski
Mickola Vorokhta
Alexander Voytovych

W 
David Ossipovitch Widhopff

Y 
Tetyana Yablonska
Nikolai Yaroshenko
Yelena Yemchuk
Vasyl Yermylov
Ivan Yizhakevych

Z 
Fyodor Zakharov
Viktor Zarubin
Halyna Zubchenko

See also
List of Ukrainian artists

Soviet artists